Carlos Federico Ruckauf (born July 10, 1944) is a Peronist politician in Argentina, member of the Justicialist Party. He served as Minister of Foreign Affairs from January 2002 to March 2003. He had earlier served as Vice-President of Argentina from 1995 to 1999, with Carlos Menem, and as his Interior Minister during his first administration. He was twice elected to the National Assembly following the restoration of democratic rule.

In his early career, he was appointed as a labor court judge, followed by Minister of Labor in July 1974. He signed decree 261/75 on October 6, 1974, granting blanket amnesty to the Armed Forces for the "annihilation of subversives". It is now considered a step in what became the state's "Dirty War" against political dissidents under the military dictatorship that overthrew Isabel Perón.

Early life and education
Carlos Federico Ruckauf was born in the western Buenos Aires suburb of Ramos Mejía. His parents separated when he was seven, and he lived in Mar del Plata, Salta, and Buenos Aires during the remainder of his childhood. Ruckauf enrolled at the University of Buenos Aires, and earned a juris doctor in 1967. He was hired as a fingerprint analyst by an insurance company, and was elected Adjunct Secretary of the Insurance Employees' Union, a member union of the CGT, in 1969. He married María Isabel Zapatero, and they had three children.

Political career
Through associations at CGT, Ruckauf became a close ally of Lorenzo Miguel, leader of the Steelworkers' Union. With the return of Peronists to power in 1973, he was appointed to the bench as a labor court judge.

Following a cabinet reshuffle in the wake of the Rodrigazo crisis, Miguel recommended him to President Isabel Perón for the post of Minister of Labour in July 1974, following her succession to office after the death of Juan Perón. During his tenure, Ruckauf signed decree 261/75 on October 6, 1974. It granted blanket amnesty to the Armed Forces for the "annihilation of subversives". It is considered an important early milestone in what would become the state's "Dirty War" against political dissidents. Ruckauf was later accused of being responsible for the "disappearance" of 14 Mercedes-Benz workers in 1975. He remained in office until the March 1976 coup by the military.

Unlike many others in Peron's government, he escaped arrest, allegedly with the support of Admiral Eduardo Massera, through a Federal Police official, Ramón Ramírez.

Restoration of democracy
Following the restoration of democratic rule in 1983, Carlos Ruckauf was elected as president of the Buenos Aires City chapter of the Justicialist Party.

Elected to the Argentine Chamber of Deputies in 1987, he was designated Ambassador plenipotentiary of Argentina in Italy, Malta and the FAO by the newly elected President Carlos Saúl Menem in 1989, serving as ambassador until 1991.

He was returned by voters to Congress in 1991, and named Interior Minister by Menem on March 1, 1993. Relatives of the victims of the 1994 AMIA bombing later put his role during the crisis into question. He was nominated as Menem's running-mate for the 1995 reelection campaign, and served as Vice-President of Argentina from 1995 to 1999.

Elected Governor of Buenos Aires Province in 1999, he issued the provincial Patacón bonds in August 2001 to deal with the scarcity of Argentine pesos when the 2001 Argentine economic crisis entered its most acute phase. The new president appointed by a crisis meeting of Congress, Eduardo Duhalde, named Ruckauf as Foreign Minister on January 2, 2002. He served in that position until May 25, 2003, when the Duhalde government left office.

Later in 2003 Ruckauf was elected to the Argentine Chamber of Deputies for Buenos Aires Province. He sat in the center-right Federal Peronism caucus opposed to the government of Néstor Kirchner, until leaving Congress in 2007.

References

External links

1944 births
Living people
Argentine people of German descent
People from Ramos Mejía
University of Buenos Aires alumni
Members of the General Confederation of Labour (Argentina)
Members of the Argentine Chamber of Deputies elected in Buenos Aires Province
Ambassadors of Argentina to Italy
Ambassadors of Argentina to Malta
Vice presidents of Argentina
Governors of Buenos Aires Province
Foreign ministers of Argentina
Justicialist Party politicians
Argentine anti-communists
Ministers of Internal Affairs of Argentina